(formerly Aster lucayanus) is a species of flowering plant of the aster family (Asteraceae) endemic to the North American island of Grand Bahama.

The holotype for the basionym Aster lucayanus was collected 5 February 1905 at Eight Mile Rock which is roughly at coordinates . The holotype is stored in the New York Botanical Garden Steere Herbarium, and a high-definition image of it can be found online.

Notes

Citations

References

lucayanum
Flora of the Bahamas
Endemic flora of the Bahamas
Plants described in 1906
Taxa named by Nathaniel Lord Britton